Chaplain (Colonel) Alva Jennings Brasted, USA (July 5, 1876 – May 27, 1965) was an American Army officer who served as the 4th Chief of Chaplains of the United States Army from 1933 to 1937.

References

Further reading

1876 births
1965 deaths
Chiefs of Chaplains of the United States Army
United States Army colonels
Burials at Arlington National Cemetery